A list of films produced in Spain in 1951 (see 1951 in film).

1951

External links
 Spanish films of 1951 at the Internet Movie Database

1951
Lists of 1951 films by country or language
Films